Digitalis canariensis is a member of the genus Digitalis.

Taxonomy
This species is part of section Isoplexis, which was temporarily accepted as an own genus. The synonym Isoplexis canariensis also continues to be used. In general, as of 2017, opinions concerning the taxonomic status of Isoplexis species differ depending on the source.

Description
Individuals of these species are small, evergreen plants growing into rounded shrubs up to 150 cm tall. The plant has lanceolate-ovoid leaves with toothed margins. The leaves are spirally arranged. The inflorescence is a cluster of orange-reddish, 3 cm large flowers with short petals and noticeable upper lip and lower lip. Bird pollination by the island populations of Phylloscopus species has been documented. The fruit is a capsule.

Digitalis canariensis contains cardenolids (cardiac glycosids), which are toxic in the case of an overdose. Medical use is documented, primarily historical in nature.

Distribution
Digitalis canariensis is endemic to the Canary Islands where it occurs on the islands of Tenerife, La Gomera and La Palma. It grows in wooded areas in laurel forest and Erica arborea-covered woods.

References

canariensis
Endemic flora of the Canary Islands
Plants described in 1753
Taxa named by Carl Linnaeus